Dilley may refer to:
Places in the United States
Dilley, Oregon, an unincorporated community
 Dilley, Texas, a city
Dilley Independent School District
Dilley High School
Dilleys Mill, West Virginia
Dilley House, a historic house in Pine Bluff, Arkansas
MacMillan-Dilley House, a historic house in Pine Bluff, Arkansas

Other
 Dilley (surname)
Billy Dilley's Super-Duper Subterranean Summer, an American animated TV series